Dallmeyer Peak is a peak,  high, standing  southwest of Steinheil Point on the south side of Andvord Bay, on the west coast of Graham Land. The peak appears on an Argentine government chart of 1952. It was named by the UK Antarctic Place-Names Committee in 1960 for John H. Dallmeyer, an English (formerly German) optician who independently developed the "rectilinear" photographic lens.

References 

Mountains of Graham Land
Danco Coast